Danilo Valério Sacramento (born 3 November 1982, in Araras) is a retired Brazilian football midfielder. Danilo previously played for Ponte Preta and Vasco da Gama in the Campeonato Brasileiro.

References

External links

1982 births
Living people
People from Araras
Brazilian footballers
Brazilian expatriate footballers
Association football midfielders
CR Vasco da Gama players
Associação Atlética Ponte Preta players
Genoa C.F.C. players
Serie A players
Expatriate footballers in Italy
RC Celta de Vigo players
Expatriate footballers in Spain
Guarani FC players
Clube Atlético Bragantino players
Esporte Clube XV de Novembro (Piracicaba) players
Footballers from São Paulo (state)